The Wallaceburg Antique Motor Boat Outing ("WAMBO") in Wallaceburg, Ontario, is an annual summer festival of antique, classic, and specialty vehicles. Started in 1988, it takes place on the second weekend of August every year. The event attracts approximately 30 000 visitors to see antique boats, cars, motorcycles, airplanes, fire trucks, tractors, and other various antique vehicles. 

In addition to antique vehicle exhibitions, WAMBO also includes a number of other significant events: A car dream cruise, soap box races, a toy show, art in the park, live bands, food vendors, art and craft vendors, pioneer crafts at the museum, camping in Crothers Park, and free admission to the Wallaceburg and District Museum.

References

External links
Town of Wallaceburg
Wallaceburg Antique Motor and Boat Outing (WAMBO)
Wallaceburg & District Museum
Wallaceburg & District Chamber of Commerce

Festivals in Ontario
Tourist attractions in Chatham-Kent